Samuel Abu Jinapor , (born 1983) is a Ghanaian lawyer and politician. He is a member of the New Patriotic Party and the Member of Parliament for the Damongo Constituency. In 2017, President Akufo-Addo appointed him as Deputy Chief of Staff in charge of Operations at the Office of the President, at the age of 33, the youngest in the history of Ghana to occupy such a position. He is currently the Minister for Lands and Natural Resources.

Early life and education

Jinapor was born in 1983 to Abudulai Jinapor, a former police officer and Chief of Buipe in the Savannah Region of Ghana. He attended the Kwame Nkrumah University of Science and Technology and graduated with a Bachelor of Science degree in physics in 2006. He proceeded to the University of Ghana in 2008 where he earned a Bachelor of Laws in 2010. That same year, he was admitted to read LLB at Ghana School of Law, Makola, Accra. He was called to the Ghana Bar in 2012 as a Solicitor and Barrister of the Supreme Court of Ghana. He also holds a Master of Laws in Alternative Dispute Resolution from the Faculty of Law, University Of Ghana.

Education 
He graduated from Kwame Nkrumah University of Science and Technology with a Bachelor of Science degree in Physics, and specialized in Biomedical Physics.

His intellectual thirst and political aspirations led him to enroll to be trained as a lawyer – a goal he accomplished successfully. Consequently, he was called to the Ghana Bar in 2012, and has since been a qualified Barrister and Solicitor of the Supreme Court of Ghana.

He earned his master's degree in law (LL.M) in Alternative Dispute Resolution (ADR) from the Faculty of Law, University of Ghana, in May 2017. In the course of his studies, amongst others, he successfully took academic sessions in International Commercial Arbitration, Labour Law, Law and Society.

Career
As a newly enrolled lawyer, he undertook his pupillage with the reputable Messrs. Kulendi@Law, an Accra-based commercial and corporate law firm, from October 2012 to August 2013. He studied under the tutelage of the renowned lawyer, Yonny Kulendi, who is now a Justice of the Supreme Court of Ghana.

Within a relatively short period, Hon. Jinapor rose to the position of Senior Associate. In this capacity, he developed the skills for quick thinking and oratory, and he served as an advocate in major commercial and corporate litigations. Whilst at the firm, Hon. Jinapor acted as a transactional lawyer for several complex, commercial negotiations, both domestically and internationally.

Again, as Senior Associate, he was periodically assigned to manage a team of lawyers from diverse backgrounds. Over the years, he had the rare opportunity of representing major foreign companies in Ghana as a Solicitor and Legal Advocate, both in Ghanaian Courts and Arbitral Tribunals.

Political life
His interest in the country's public affairs encouraged him to join politics in 2004, and he has since been a widely known and excellent Political Activist. His first foreign relations exposure came when, at an early age of twenty-three (23), he had the unusual opportunity to accompany the then President of the Republic, His Excellency John Agyekum Kufour, on his historic State Visit to the United Kingdom (UK) in 2007, as a Communications Aide, where he made appearances on shows of various media houses in the UK.

The watershed moment came, when in 2007, he was privileged and honoured to be appointed by Nana Addo Dankwa Akufo-Addo, then presidential aspirant of the New Patriotic Party, as his Campaign Aide in the 2007 NPP presidential primaries. This is a position he held in both the 2008 and 2012 general elections.

In the 2016 general elections, Hon. Jinapor played a major political advocacy role for the New Patriotic Party (NPP) and its presidential candidate, Akufo-Addo. He was seen and heard on major media and campaign platforms across the country, taking on the incumbent Mahama Government, and promoting the policies of his Party, the NPP, a task he executed brilliantly with considerable courage and tenacity, earning him the admiration of many. He is a dedicated member of the New Patriotic Party.

In 2017, President Akufo-Addo appointed him as Deputy Chief of Staff in charge of Operations at the Office of the President, at a very youthful age of thirty-three (33), the youngest in the history of Ghana to occupy such a position. As Deputy Chief of Staff, he assisted the Chief of Staff in mobilising government machinery to support the execution of the President's agenda for the country. Having worked, closely, in various capacities with President Akufo-Addo, both in opposition and government, Mr. Jinapor has gained considerable experience in the workings of government.

In 2020, whilst still performing his demanding task as Deputy Chief of Staff, he contested the parliamentary seat of Damongo, the maternal hometown of former President John Dramani Mahama, the 2020 Presidential Candidate of the National Democratic Congress (NDC), and won that highly competitive election with a significant margin of victory, becoming the first MP from the New Patriotic Party since the inception of the fourth republic.

He has since been nicknamed, “Man of Action” by his constituents.

President Akufo-Addo nominated him as the Minister responsible for Lands and Natural Resources in his second term government. As many pundits have attested, he has, thus far, held and executed his onerous and consequential ministerial duties with courage and integrity.

Personal life
He is happily married to Mrs. Naada D.B. Jinapor, a Lawyer and head of the Corporate Law Department of the Social Security and National Insurance Trust (SSNIT) of Ghana and their marriage is blessed with four (4) children.

References

Living people
21st-century Ghanaian lawyers
People from Northern Region (Ghana)
University of Ghana alumni
Kwame Nkrumah University of Science and Technology alumni
Ghana School of Law alumni
1983 births
New Patriotic Party politicians
Ghanaian MPs 2021–2025